Heart block (HB) is a disorder in the heart's rhythm due to a fault in the natural pacemaker. This is caused by an obstruction – a block – in the electrical conduction system of the heart. Sometimes a disorder can be inherited. Despite the severe-sounding name, heart block may cause no symptoms at all in some cases, or occasional missed heartbeats in other cases (which can cause light-headedness, syncope (fainting), and palpitations), or may require the implantation of an  artificial pacemaker, depending upon exactly where in the heart conduction is being impaired and how significantly it is affected.

Heart block should not be confused with other conditions, which may or may not be co-occurring, relating to the heart and/or other nearby organs that are or can be serious, including angina (heart-related chest pain), heart attack (myocardial infarction), any type of heart failure, cardiogenic shock or other types of shock, different types of abnormal heart rhythms (arrhythmias), cardiac arrest, or respiratory arrest.

In severe cases where the heart's ability to control and trigger heartbeats may be completely ineffective or unreliable, heart block can usually be treated by inserting an artificial pacemaker, a medical device that provides correct electrical impulses to trigger heart beats, compensating for the natural pacemaker's unreliability. Therefore, heart block frequently has no effects, or mild and occasional effects, and is not life-threatening in the vast majority of cases, and is usually treatable in more serious cases.

The human heart uses electrical signals to maintain and initiate the regular  heartbeat in a living person; incorrect conduction or interference from external sources can lead to mild or serious symptoms depending upon the location of the blockage and how severely conduction is being blocked. Conduction is initiated by the sinoatrial node ("sinus node" or "SA node"), and then travels to the atrioventricular node ("AV node") which also contains a secondary "pacemaker" that acts as a backup for the SA nodes, then to the bundle of His and then via the bundle branches to the point of the apex of the  fascicular branches. Blockages are therefore classified based on where the blockage occurs - namely the SA node ("Sinoatrial block"), AV node ("AV block" or AVB), and at or below the bundle of His ("Intra-Hisian" or "Infra-Hisian block" respectively). Infra-Hisian blocks may occur at the left or right bundle branches ("bundle branch block") or the fascicles of the left bundle branch ("fascicular block" or "Hemiblock"). SA and AV node blocks are each divided into three degrees, with second-degree blocks being divided into two types (written either "type I or II" or "type 1 or 2"). The term "Wenckebach block" is also used for second degree type 1 blocks of either the SA or AV node; in addition second-degree blocks type 1 and 2 are also sometimes known as " Mobitz 1" and "Mobitz 2".

Clinically speaking, the blocks tend to have more serious potential the closer they are to the "end" of the electrical path (the muscles of the heart regulated by the heartbeat), and less serious effects the closer they are to the "start" (at the SA node), because the potential disruption becomes greater as more of the "path" is "blocked" from its "end" point.  Therefore, most of the important heart blocks are AV nodal blocks and infra-Hisian blocks. SA blocks are usually of lesser clinical significance, since in the event of SA block, the AV node contains a secondary pacemaker which would still maintain a heart rate of around 40 - 60 beats per minute, sufficient for consciousness and much of daily life in the majority of individuals.

Types

Following the path of the electrical signals, the places where conduction can be blocked give rise to different kinds of heart blocks:

SA and AV node blocks are each divided into three degrees, with second degree blocks being divided into two types (written either "type I or II" or "type 1 or 2").  In an SA block, the electrical impulse is delayed or blocked on the way to the atria, thus delaying atrial depolarization. By contrast, an AV block occurs in the AV node and delays ventricular depolarization. The term "Wenckebach block" is also used for some heart blocks, and can refer to a second degree type I block in either the SA node or the AV node, however the ECG features of the two are quite distinctly different.

SA nodal blocks
SA blocks rarely give severe symptoms, because even if an individual had complete block at this level of the conduction system (which is uncommon), the secondary pacemaker of the heart would be at the AV node, which would fire at 40 to 60 beats a minute, which is enough to retain consciousness in the resting state. However SA block is capable of causing problematic symptoms even so, and may also hint at conduction issues elsewhere in the heart, and therefore SA blocks are - despite their lower level of life-threatening risk - still "the most common indication for pacemaker implantation in the US".

Types of SA nodal blocks include:
 SA node Wenckebach (Mobitz I)
 SA node Mobitz II
 SA node exit block

In addition to the above blocks, the SA node can be suppressed by any other arrhythmia that reaches it.  This includes retrograde conduction from the ventricles, ectopic atrial beats, atrial fibrillation, and atrial flutter.

The difference between SA node block and SA node suppression is that in SA node block an electrical impulse is generated by the SA node that doesn't make the atria contract.  In SA node suppression, on the other hand, the SA node doesn't generate an electrical impulse because it is reset by the electrical impulse that enters the SA node.

AV nodal blocks
There are three basic types of AV nodal block:
 First-degree AV block
 Second-degree AV block
 Type I second-degree AV block (Mobitz I), also known as a Wenckebach block
 Type 2 second-degree AV block (Mobitz II) - due to a block in or below the bundle of His
 Third-degree AV block (complete heart block)

Infra-Hisian block
Infra-Hisian block is that of the distal conduction system.  Types of infra-Hisian block include:
 Type 2 second degree heart block (Mobitz II) –a type of AV block due to a block within or below the bundle of His
 Left anterior fascicular block
 Left posterior fascicular block
 Right bundle branch block

Of these types of infra-Hisian block, Mobitz II heart block is considered most important because of the possible progression to complete heart block.

References

External links 

Cardiac arrhythmia